Slow Turning is singer-songwriter John Hiatt's ninth album, released in 1988. It provided Hiatt's only significant radio hit with the title track. The single "Slow Turning" was also featured in the 2002 motion picture drama The Rookie which starred Dennis Quaid. "Feels Like Rain" was later covered by Buddy Guy on an album of the same name and was featured in the 2004 Kate Hudson movie Raising Helen. Aaron Neville also covered "Feels Like Rain" on his 1991 album "Warm Your Heart".  "Drive South" became a No. 2 country hit for Suzy Bogguss in early 1993.  "Icy Blue Heart" was covered by Emmylou Harris on her 1989 album Bluebird, with backing vocals by Bonnie Raitt, and was covered later by Linda Ronstadt on her 1998 album We Ran. Ilse DeLange recorded "It'll Come To You"" and "Feels Like Rain" on her live album "Dear John". During the barroom scene in the film "Thelma and Louise", the band is playing "Tennessee Plates" (Charlie Sexton recorded the song for the soundtrack album).

Though not credited on the album cover, Hiatt is backed by The Goners.

Track listing
All tracks written by John Hiatt, except "Tennessee Plates", written by John Hiatt and Mike Porter.

"Drive South" – 3:55
"Trudy and Dave" – 4:25
"Tennessee Plates" – 2:57
"Icy Blue Heart" – 4:34
"Sometime Other Than Now" – 4:25
"Georgia Rae" – 4:26
"Ride Along" – 3:31
"Slow Turning" – 3:36
"It'll Come to You" – 3:29
"Is Anybody There?" – 5:01
"Paper Thin" – 3:35
"Feels Like Rain" – 4:51

Charts

Personnel
John Hiatt - guitar, vocals, electric piano
Kenneth Blevins - drums, tambourine
Sonny Landreth - electric guitar, acoustic slide guitar, 12-string guitar, National steel guitar
David "Now" Ranson – bass guitar
James Hooker – Hammond organ
Bernie Leadon – guitar, mandolin, banjo, mandocello
Ashley Cleveland – backing vocals
Dennis Locorriere – backing vocals
Technical
Anton Corbijn – photography

References

1988 albums
John Hiatt albums
Albums produced by Glyn Johns
A&M Records albums